Marbella Fútbol Club, formerly known as Unión Deportiva Marbella, is a Spanish football team based in Marbella, the autonomous community of Andalusia. Founded in 1997 it currently plays in Tercera Federación – Group 9 (the 5th level of the Spanish football league system), holding home matches at Estadio Municipal de Marbella.

History
Unión Deportiva Marbella was founded in 1997 immediately after the defunction of Club Atlético Marbella, which was born 38 years before and was owned by Jesús Gil, also the chairman of Atlético de Madrid. The club was registered on 30 January 1998 as U.D. Marbella and San Pedro Alcántara. In 2000–01, the team won its Tercera División group but came second to Real Betis B in the promotion play-offs. It subsequently qualified to the Copa del Rey for the first time, losing 0–1 at home to CD Díter Zafra in the preliminary round. In 2003, it was finally promoted to Segunda División B.

Marbella was taken over by leading businessmen Ian Radford and Wayne Elliott of the HI Group, an international sports, leisure, property and travel company in September 2007. In 2009, the club contested the play-offs for promotion to Segunda División for the first time, losing 2–1 on aggregate to Lorca Deportiva. In the ensuing domestic cup season, it reached the last 32 before an 8–0 aggregate loss to Atlético; the league campaign ended with relegation after seven years in the third tier.

On 28 June 2013 Unión was renamed Marbella Fútbol Club, by consent of the Russian ownership presided by Alexander Grinberg, in order to appeal to a wider foreign fanbase. At the end of the season, it ended four years in the fourth division with a 3–2 aggregate win over CD Eldense after extra time in the play-offs. By finishing second in the regular season, Marbella played in the 2018 Segunda División B play-offs, and lost on penalties in the first round to Celta de Vigo B.

Club background
Atlético Marbella: 1947–1997
UD Marbella: 1997–2013
Marbella FC: 2013–present

Season to season
As UD Marbella

As Marbella FC

13 seasons in Segunda División B
9 seasons in Tercera División
2 seasons in Tercera Federación

Current squad

Honours
Tercera División: (2) 2001–02, 2013–14

Former players

Former coaches
 Juan López Muñiz
 Oli
 Alfredo Santaelena

Stadium
Marbella plays its home games at Estadio Municipal de Marbella, which has a capacity of 7,300 spectators. It is a fairly basic oval-shaped stadium with one small covered stand.

Affiliated clubs

The following club is currently affiliated with Marbella FC:

  Hyderabad FC (2020–present)

References

External links
Official website 
Futbolme team profile 
Official youth academy website
Club & stadium history 

Football clubs in Andalusia
Association football clubs established in 1997
1997 establishments in Spain
Sport in Marbella
Phoenix clubs (association football)